Against All Odds is an annual professional wrestling Impact Plus event held by Impact Wrestling. It was established in 2005 as TNA's fourth pay-per-view event as part of the inaugural series of monthly pay-per-views put on by the promotion, and held in February. All Against All Odds PPVs but one have been held at the Impact! Zone.

The PPV was canceled in December 2012, but the event was revived as a One Night Only PPV in 2016, a television special in 2019, and an Impact Plus Monthly Special from 2021 onward.

Events

References

External links
 TNAWrestling.com - the official website of Total Nonstop Action Wrestling